Since the inception of the Premier League, England's highest level of association football annual league tournament, 60 football stadiums have been used to host matches. The inaugural round of Premier League matches took place on 15 August 1992 with eleven clubs hosting the opening fixtures. Following the Hillsborough Disaster in 1989, the Taylor Report recommended the abolition of standing terraces by the start of the 1994–95 season, to be replaced by all-seater stadiums. However, following Fulham's promotion from Division 1 in the 2000–01 season, terraces returned temporarily to the Premier League as The Football Association allowed the club extra time to complete renovations. The club were forced to play at Loftus Road after inadequate progress was made in converting Craven Cottage, but they returned to their home ground after building work was completed in time for the 2004–05 season.

Burnley's Turf Moor stadium became the 50th Premier League stadium when it hosted Burnley's first ever home Premier League fixture, against champions Manchester United, on 19 August 2009. The most recent venue to become a Premier League host is the Brentford Community Stadium, which hosted its first Premier League fixture on 13 August 2021.

Stadiums
Stadiums listed in bold indicate that they are the home grounds of teams participating in the 2022–23 Premier League season, while those stadiums listed in italics have now been demolished.
 For closed or demolished grounds, capacity is taken at closure.

Footnotes

See also

 Record home attendances of English football clubs
 List of English football stadiums by capacity

References
General
 
 

Specific

Stadiums
 
Lists of association football stadiums in England